Paul Gregory (born October 26, 1952) is an American lighting designer. He is the president and founder of Focus Lighting, a New York City-based architectural lighting design firm.

Career

Gregory designed lighting for shows at regional theaters such as The Alley Theater in Houston, Texas and Stage West in Massachusetts. He was trained in theatrical lighting at the Goodman Theater School, part of the Art Institute of Chicago, and received an MFA from the Parsons School of Design.

In 1975 Gregory, along with his partner Rick Spaulding, founded Litelab Corp in Buffalo, New York.  Litelab specialized in nightclub design and eventually grew to have offices in New York, Chicago, Boston, Los Angeles, and a factory in Buffalo. Gregory left Litelab in 1985 and founded Focus Lighting.

Since its establishment in 1987, Focus Lighting has garnered numerous awards for architectural lighting design.  Gregory's lighting designs earned him an induction into Architectural Lighting Magazine's Hall of Fame and Lighting Designer of the Year award.

Notable projects
 Times Square Ball – 100th and 101st Anniversary
 Entel Tower
 Marcus Center for the Performing Arts
 Bobby Flay’s Bar Americain
 Le Cirque
 Gallery 225
 Reflect at the Stephen P. Clark Government Center in Miami
 Yotel New York

Awards

References

Living people
1952 births
Place of birth missing (living people)
Lighting designers